Rhinophis sanguineus, commonly known as the salty earth snake, is a species of uropeltid snake found in the Western Ghats of India.

Description
Description after Beddome (1864: 178): "Scales of the body large, in 15 rows; of the anterior portion of the trunk sometimes in 17; rostral much produced, very sharp, conical, horny, produced back, and covering the conjunction of the nasals; nostril in front of nasal shield; eye very small and obscure, [located] in front [portion] of ocular shield; four upper labials, 1st small, 2nd, 3rd, and 4th large; caudal disk nearly as long as tail, oblong, covered with excrescences, a red streak down the centre and one on each side. Colour of the body bluish black; belly bright red, with blackish mottlings; anal bifid; subcaudals of the male 9 or 10 pairs, each with 4 to 6 keels, and some of the approximated ventral plates and a few of the two lowest rows of scales also keeled; female subcaudals 6 or 7. Total length of large male 13 inches [33 cm], female 10 inches [25.5 cm]; circumference 1 inch [25 mm]; abdominals 195. The brilliant red colour of the abdomen fades in spirits."

Description of Rhinophis microlepis after Beddome (1864: 179): "Scales of the body small, in 15 rows; of the anterior portion of the trunk in 17, of the neck in 19. Caudal disk oblong, orbicular, one-half the length of the tail, covered with excrescences, which are confluent into streaks; subcaudals 10; anal bifid; head-plates as in R. sanguineus, but rostral less sharp. Colour of the body greyish black, with indistinct dull yellowish white mottlings; belly yellowish white, with dark mottlings; tail beneath yellowish, with a broad black spot. Abdominals very small, 199. Total length 6 inches [15 cm]; circumference 6½ lines [14 mm]"

Geographic range
It is found in southern India (Mysore [Koppa, Kalsa], Wynaad, Nilgiris, Travancore, Tinnevelly).

Type locality of Rhinophis sanguineus: "Cherambady [Cherambody], in the Wayanad (Malabar), elevation 3,500 feet".

Type locality of Rhinophis microlepis: "Mr. Minchin's Estate in the Wayanad (elevation 3,500 feet)".

References

Further reading

 Beddome, R.H. 1863. Descriptions of New Species of the Family Uropeltidæ from Southern India, with Notes on other little-known Species. Proc. Zool. Soc. London, 1863: 225-229, Plates XXV., XXVI., XXVII.
 Beddome, R.H. 1863. Further Notes upon the Snakes of the Madras Presidency; with some Descriptions of New Species. Madras Quart. J. Med. Sci., 6: 41-48 [Reprint:  J. Soc. Bibliogr. Nat. Sci., London, 1 (10): 306-314, 1940].
 Beddome, R.H. 1864. Description of New Species of the family Uropeltidae from Southern India, with Notes on other little-known Species. Ann. Mag. Nat. Hist. (3) 13: 177-180.
 Beddome, R.H. 1886 An Account of the Earth-Snakes of the Peninsula of India and Ceylon. Ann. Mag. Nat. Hist. (5) 17: 3-33.
 Mason, George E. 1888. Description of a new earth-snake of the genus Silybura from the Bombay Presidency with remarks on little known Uropeltidae. Ann. Mag. Nat. Hist. (6) 22: 184-186.

External links

 

sanguineus
Reptiles described in 1863